Michael Sather (born c. 1947) is a former MLA for Maple Ridge-Pitt Meadows in the Canadian province of British Columbia. As a member of the British Columbia New Democratic Party, he was elected to the Legislative Assembly in the 2005 election, and was re-elected in 2009.

In November 2008, he ran for mayor of Maple Ridge, finishing second to Ernie Daykin.

Sather has a bachelor of science degree in biology and a master's degree in psychology. He moved to B.C. in 1974 and worked on fishing boats and oil rigs, owned and operated a wilderness tourism business, and worked as a mental health therapist.

In August 2011 Sather announced he would not run for re-election in 2013, but would finish out his term.

References

1947 births
British Columbia New Democratic Party MLAs
Living people
People from Grande Prairie
People from Maple Ridge, British Columbia
21st-century Canadian politicians